Klementynów may refer to the following places:
Klementynów, Łódź Voivodeship (central Poland)
Klementynów, Lublin Voivodeship (east Poland)
Klementynów, Masovian Voivodeship (east-central Poland)